Verkhniye Taltsy is a rural locality (a selo) in Khorinsky District, Republic of Buryatia, Russia. The population was 1,100 as of 2010. There are 15 streets.

Geography 
Verkhniye Taltsy is located 71 km west of Khorinsk (the district's administrative centre) by road. Khandagay is the nearest rural locality.

References 

Rural localities in Khorinsky District